The South Sudan STEPS Towards Peace and Democracy is a political movement in the Republic of South Sudan.

Origins
The Sudan People's Liberation Movement (SPLM), the governing party of South Sudan, fractured in December 2013, leading to the ongoing civil war that has killed thousands and forced a large number of people to seek refugees in neighbouring countries. The party was formed by senior officials who have split from the Sudan People's Liberation Movement (SPLM) faction allied to President Salva Kiir.

History
A month after announcing her intention to run in the upcoming South Sudanese presidential election, Suzanne Jambo officially announced the formation of a new political party via Facebook on November 29, 2017.

Members

Elected officials
Chairman:  Suzanne Jambo - Interim
Deputy Chairman: 
Secretary General:

Founding members

See also 
 Sudan People's Liberation Movement

References

Sudan People's Liberation Movement
Political parties established in 2017
Political parties in South Sudan
2017 establishments in South Sudan